Azucena is a Venezuelan telenovela written by María Antonieta Gómez and Édgar Mejías and produced by Radio Caracas Televisión in 1984. The series lasted only 32 episodes, and was distributed internationally by RCTV International.

Grecia Colmenares and Javier Vidal starred as the main protagonists.

Synopsis 
Azucena is a humble young woman from the poor side of town who sees her wedding plans to Rodolfo, a rich young man, crumble. His family does not accept this marriage due to the difference in social background. A family debt makes Rodolfo marry Brenda Mirabal and Azucena decides to marry an old boyfriend in spite of the fact that she is expecting Rodolfo’s baby, who is not aware of the truth. Through terrible conflicts this couple continue to fight for their love until, in spite of doubts, pain and betrayal, it triumphs.

Cast
Grecia Colmenares as Azucena Rodríguez
Javier Vidal as Rodolfo Itriago
Romelia Agüero as Renata San Lucas
Gladys Caceres as Trinita
Arturo Calderón as Germán Rosas
Nohely Arteaga as Ornella
Carlos Camara Jr. as Julio
Yanis Chimaras as Rafael
Julie Restifo as Brenda
Carlos Márquez as Iván Rómulo

References

External links
Grecia Colmenares website

1984 telenovelas
RCTV telenovelas
Venezuelan telenovelas
1984 Venezuelan television series debuts
1984 Venezuelan television series endings
Spanish-language telenovelas
Television shows set in Caracas